Arnoud van Groen (born December 11, 1983, in Monnickendam) is a Dutch cyclist.

Palmares
2007
2nd Ster van Zwolle
2008
2nd Ster van Zwolle
2010
2nd Dwars door Drenthe
2nd Halle–Ingooigem

References

1983 births
Living people
Dutch male cyclists
People from Monnickendam
Cyclists from North Holland
20th-century Dutch people
21st-century Dutch people